Chaos Marauders is a card-based board game for 2-4 players designed by Stephen Hand, illustrated by John Blanche and was published by Games Workshop in 1987. A second edition was published by Fantasy Flight Games in 2009.

The object of the game is to create "battle lines" of orcs and a motley assortment of creatures from the Warhammer universe, including skaven (with their formidable Horned Rat Standard, and "Clan Skyrre Blowback" flamethrower), goblins, dwarf captives, hobgoblins, "crummy snotling slaves", an Orc War Wyvern and the eponymous Chaos Marauders.

The game is notable for its similarity to the 1977 boardgame Ogallala :de:Ogallala (Spiel).

Gameplay 
The various creatures are represented by colour cards, and being awarded different Attack Point and Victory Point statistics, and players must use these to build up to 3 'battle lines' on their battle sheet. The beginning of a battle line starts with a standard bearer and ends with a musician.  Additional cards are placed in between these as each player draws and places them on their playsheet in turn. There are restrictions on placement based on troop-types and clan-allegiance which are indicated by the symbols on the cards. Some of the cards have special abilities, or act as random events  - such as Odlugg Spleenripper, an ogre who might eat all your troop cards, or the aforementioned Skyrre's Blowback which might destroy an entire battle line of another player, or explode and destroy the attacker. 

Once a line of cards is complete, the total of its Attack Points are calculated, then it may 'attack' an incomplete battle-line of the opponent - the success of which is determined by rolling the "Cube of Devastation" - a six sided dice with 5 sides emblazoned with an orcish eye, and one, with the Mark of Chaos. If the dreaded Mark of Chaos is rolled, the attacker's line routs, and the defender wins all their booty (cards with Victory Points but no Attack Points) and they lose all their troop cards.  If an orcish eye is rolled, the opposite occurs.

The winner is determined the player who has accumulated the most Victory Points when all three battle lines have been completed on one sheet.

Critical response
The game was enthusiastically received at the 1987 Games Day, with an over-booked tournament, and impromptu games being set up around the official event. A number of 'expansion kits' were planned, potentially featuring other armies and races from the Warhammer universe, but none were produced.

Reviews
 Casus Belli #42 (Dec 1987)

Controversy
Whilst the game is credited to Stephen Hand, it bears a strong resemblance to the German board game Ogallala (1977) :de:Ogallala (Spiel), designed by Rudi Hoffmann and published in English as Up the Creek by Waddingtons. Hoffman also later produced a sci-fi themed version for Waddingtons called "Starships" (1980).  The similarity to Hoffmanns game lead to accusations of plagiarism being made against Games Workshop in the gaming small-press and German media.

References

External links

Fantasy board games
Warhammer Fantasy
Board games introduced in 1987